Jiří Kopáč (born 23 February 1982) is a Czech rower. He competed in the Men's lightweight coxless four event at the 2012 Summer Olympics.

References

External links

1982 births
Living people
Czech male rowers
Olympic rowers of the Czech Republic
Rowers at the 2012 Summer Olympics
Rowers at the 2016 Summer Olympics
Rowers from Prague
World Rowing Championships medalists for the Czech Republic
21st-century Czech people